The Yellowstone Caldera, sometimes referred to as the Yellowstone Supervolcano, is a volcanic caldera and supervolcano in Yellowstone National Park in the Western United States. The caldera and most of the park are located in the northwest corner of Wyoming.  The caldera measures , and postcaldera lavas spill out a significant distance beyond the caldera proper.

The caldera formed during the last of three supereruptions over the past 2.1 million years: the Huckleberry Ridge eruption 2.1 million years ago (which created the Island Park Caldera and the Huckleberry Ridge Tuff), the Mesa Falls eruption 1.3 million years ago (which created the Henry's Fork Caldera and the Mesa Falls Tuff), and the Lava Creek eruption approximately 640,000 years ago (which created the Yellowstone Caldera and the Lava Creek Tuff).

Volcanoes at Yellowstone

Volcanism at Yellowstone is relatively recent, with calderas created by large eruptions that took place 2.1 million, 1.3 million, and 640,000 years ago. The calderas lie over the Yellowstone hotspot under the Yellowstone Plateau where light and hot magma (molten rock) from the mantle rises toward the surface. The hotspot appears to move across terrain in the east-northeast direction, and is responsible for the eastern half of Idaho's Snake River Plain, but in fact the hotspot is much deeper than the surrounding  terrain and remains stationary while the North American Plate moves west-southwest over it.

Over the past 16.5 million years or so, this hotspot has generated a succession of explosive eruptions and less violent floods of basaltic lava. Together these eruptions have helped create the eastern part of the Snake River Plain (to the west of Yellowstone) from a once-mountainous region. At least a dozen of these eruptions were so massive that they are classified as supereruptions. Volcanic eruptions sometimes empty their stores of magma so swiftly that the overlying land collapses into the emptied magma chamber, forming a geographic depression called a caldera.

Progressively younger caldera remnants, most grouped in several overlapping volcanic fields, extend from the Nevada–Oregon border through the eastern Snake River Plain and terminate in the Yellowstone Plateau. The United States Geological Survey (USGS) estimates there are one or two major caldera-forming eruptions and a hundred or so lava extruding eruptions per million years, and "several to many" steam eruptions per century.

The loosely defined term "supervolcano" has been used to describe volcanic fields that produce exceptionally large volcanic eruptions. Thus defined, the Yellowstone Supervolcano is the volcanic field that produced the latest three supereruptions from the Yellowstone hotspot; it also produced one additional smaller eruption, thereby creating the West Thumb of Yellowstone Lake 174,000 years ago. The three supereruptions occurred 2.1 million, 1.3 million, and approximately 640,000 years ago, forming the Island Park Caldera, the Henry's Fork Caldera, and Yellowstone calderas, respectively. The Island Park Caldera supereruption (2.1 million years ago), which produced the Huckleberry Ridge Tuff, was the largest, and produced 2,500 times as much ash as the 1980 Mount St. Helens eruption. The next biggest supereruption formed the Yellowstone Caldera (640,000 years ago) and produced the Lava Creek Tuff. The Henry's Fork Caldera (1.2 million years ago) produced the smaller Mesa Falls Tuff, but is the only caldera from the Snake River Plain-Yellowstone hotspot that is plainly visible today.

Non-explosive eruptions of lava and less-violent explosive eruptions have occurred in and near the Yellowstone caldera since the last supereruption. The most recent lava flow occurred about 70,000 years ago, while a violent eruption excavated the West Thumb of Lake Yellowstone 174,000 years ago. Smaller steam explosions occur as well: an explosion 13,800 years ago left a  diameter crater at Mary Bay on the edge of Yellowstone Lake (located in the center of the caldera). Currently, volcanic activity is exhibited via numerous geothermal vents scattered throughout the region, including the famous Old Faithful Geyser, plus recorded ground-swelling indicating ongoing inflation of the underlying magma chamber.

The volcanic eruptions, as well as the continuing geothermal activity, are a result of a great plume of magma located below the caldera's surface. The magma in this plume contains gases that are kept dissolved by the immense pressure under which the magma is contained. If the pressure is released to a sufficient degree by some geological shift, then some of the gases bubble out and cause the magma to expand. This can cause a chain reaction. If the expansion results in further relief of pressure, for example, by blowing crust material off the top of the chamber, the result is a very large gas explosion.

It also has  underground volume, of which 6–8% is filled with molten rock. This is about 2.5 times bigger than scientists had previously imagined it to be; however, scientists believe that the proportion of molten rock in the chamber is far too low to allow for another supereruption.

In October 2017, research from the Arizona State University indicated prior to Yellowstone's last supereruption, magma surged into the magma chamber in two large influxes. An analysis of crystals from Yellowstone's lava showed that prior to the last supereruption, the magma chamber underwent a rapid increase in temperature and change in composition. The analysis indicated that Yellowstone's magma reservoir can reach eruptive capacity and trigger a super-eruption within just decades, not centuries as volcanologists had originally thought.

IUGS geological heritage site
In respect of it being 'well-known for its past explosive volcanic eruptions and lava flows as well for its world class hydrothermal system', the International Union of Geological Sciences (IUGS) included 'The Yellowstone volcanic and hydrothermal system' in its assemblage of 100 'geological heritage sites' around the world in a listing published in October 2022. The organization defines an IUGS Geological Heritage Site as 'a key place with geological elements and/or processes of international scientific relevance, used as a reference, and/or with a substantial contribution to the development of geological sciences through history.'

Yellowstone hotspot origin

The source of the Yellowstone hotspot is controversial. Some geoscientists hypothesize that the Yellowstone hotspot is the effect of an interaction between local conditions in the lithosphere and upper mantle convection. Others suggest an origin in the deep mantle (mantle plume). Part of the controversy is the relatively sudden appearance of the hotspot in the geologic record. Additionally, the Columbia Basalt flows appeared at the same approximate time in the same place, prompting speculation that they share a common origin.  As the Yellowstone hotspot traveled to the east and north, the Columbia disturbance moved northward and eventually subsided.

An alternate theory to the mantle plume model was proposed in 2018. It is suggested that the volcanism may be caused by upwellings from the lower mantle resulting from water-rich fragments of the Farallon Plate descending from the Cascadia subduction region, sheared off at a subducted spreading rift.

Hazards

Earthquakes

Volcanic and tectonic actions in the region cause between 1,000 and 2,000 measurable earthquakes annually. Most are relatively minor, measuring a magnitude of 3 or weaker. Occasionally, numerous earthquakes are detected in a relatively short period of time, an event known as an earthquake swarm. In 1985, more than 3,000 earthquakes were measured over a period of several months. More than 70 smaller swarms were detected between 1983 and 2008. The USGS states these swarms are likely caused by slips on pre-existing faults rather than by movements of magma or hydrothermal fluids.

In December 2008, continuing into January 2009, more than 500 quakes were detected under the northwest end of Yellowstone Lake over a seven-day span, with the largest registering a magnitude of 3.9. Another swarm started in January 2010, after the Haiti earthquake and before the Chile earthquake. With 1,620 small earthquakes between January 17, 2010, and February 1, 2010, this swarm was the second-largest ever recorded in the Yellowstone Caldera. The largest of these shocks was a magnitude 3.8 that occurred on January 21, 2010. This swarm subsided to background levels by February 21. On March 30, 2014, at 6:34 AM MST, a magnitude 4.8 earthquake struck Yellowstone, the largest recorded there since February 1980. In February 2018, more than 300 earthquakes occurred, with the largest being a magnitude 2.9.

Volcanoes

The upward movement of the Yellowstone caldera floor between 2004 and 2008—almost  each year—was more than three times greater than ever observed since such measurements began in 1923. In January 2010, the USGS stated that "uplift of the Yellowstone Caldera has slowed significantly" and that uplift continues but at a slower pace. USGS, University of Utah and National Park Service scientists with the Yellowstone Volcano Observatory maintain that they "see no evidence that another such cataclysmic eruption will occur at Yellowstone in the foreseeable future. Recurrence intervals of these events are neither regular nor predictable." This conclusion was reiterated in December 2013 in the aftermath of the publication of a study by University of Utah scientists finding that the "size of the magma body beneath Yellowstone is significantly larger than had been thought". The Yellowstone Volcano Observatory issued a statement on its website stating:
Although fascinating, the new findings do not imply increased geologic hazards at Yellowstone, and certainly do not increase the chances of a 'supereruption' in the near future. Contrary to some media reports, Yellowstone is not 'overdue' for a supereruption.
Media reports were more hyperbolic in their coverage.

A study published in GSA Today, the monthly news and science magazine of the Geological Society of America, identified three fault zones where future eruptions are most likely to be centered. Two of those areas are associated with lava flows aged 174,000–70,000 years, and the third is a focus of present-day seismicity.

In 2017, NASA conducted a study to determine the feasibility of preventing the volcano from erupting. The results suggested that cooling the magma chamber by 35 percent would be enough to forestall such an incident. NASA proposed introducing water at high pressure 10 kilometers underground. The circulating water would release heat at the surface, possibly in a way that could be used as a geothermal power source. If enacted, the plan would cost about $3.46 billion. On the other hand, according to Brian Wilcox of the Jet Propulsion Laboratory, such a project might trigger rather than prevent an eruption.

Hydrothermal explosions

Studies and analysis may indicate that the greater hazard comes from hydrothermal activity which occurs independently of volcanic activity. Over 20 large craters have been produced in the past 14,000 years, resulting in such features as Mary Bay, Turbid Lake, and Indian Pond, which was created in an eruption about 1300 BC.

In 2016, the USGS announced plans to map the subterranean systems responsible for feeding the area's hydrothermal activity. According to the researchers, these maps could help predict when another supereruption occurs.

See also

 Iceland hotspot and Iceland plume describes aspects of volcanic processes
 Lake Taupō
 Lake Toba
 Long Valley Caldera, Valles Caldera, La Garita Caldera: Examples of other calderas close to but not related to Yellowstone.
 Toba catastrophe theory

References

Further reading

External links

 The Snake River Plain and the Yellowstone Hot Spot
 Yellowstone Volcano Observatory
 FAQ relating to the supervolcano
 Supervolcano documentary from BBC
  Interactive: When Yellowstone Explodes  from National Geographic

 The Yellowstone magmatic system from the mantle plume to the upper crust (46,000 km3 magma reservoir below chamber)
 Inside Yellowstone's Supervolcano - National Geographic

 
Landforms of Park County, Wyoming
Landforms of Teton County, Wyoming
Landforms of Yellowstone National Park
Supervolcanoes
Complex volcanoes
Hotspot volcanoes
VEI-8 volcanoes
Volcanism of Wyoming
Volcanism of Idaho
Volcanoes of Wyoming
Volcanoes of Idaho
Calderas of Idaho
Calderas of Wyoming
Snake River
Potentially active volcanoes
Yellowstone hotspot
Geological hazards
Pleistocene calderas
First 100 IUGS Geological Heritage Sites